This page is a list of Guggenheim Fellowships awarded in 1991.

United States and Canada Fellows

Janet Abramowicz, Artist, New York City; Senior Lecturer on Fine Arts, Harvard University
Allen L. Anderson, Composer; Assistant Professor of Music, Brandeis University
Janis Antonovics, James J. Wolfe Professor of Botany and Director, University Program in Genetics, Duke University
Renee Baillargeon, Professor of Psychology, University of Illinois at Urbana-Champaign
Tina Barney, Photographer, Watch Hill, Rhode Island
Madison Smartt Bell, Writer; Writer in Residence, Director of Creative Writing, Goucher College
Edward Allen Boyle, Professor of Chemical Oceanography, Massachusetts Institute of Technology: 1991
Thomas Boyle, Writer; Professor of English, Brooklyn College, City University of New York
John Brewer, John and Marion Sullivan University Professor, University of Chicago
David Brody, Artist and Musician; Professor of Art, University of Washington, Seattle
James H. Brown, Regents' Professor of Biology, University of New Mexico
Joan Jacobs Brumberg, Stephen H. Weiss Presidential Fellow and Professor of Human Development and Women's Studies, Cornell University
Ann Marie Callaway, Composer, Rodeo, California
David Carroll, Professor of French, University of California, Irvine
Vincent J. Cheng, Associate Professor of English, University of Southern California
Daniel Chirot, Professor of International Studies and of Sociology, University of Washington
Carolyn A. Chute, Writer, Parsonsfield, Maine
Joseph D. Collins, Development Policy Analyst; Lecturer in Sociology, University of California, Santa Cruz
Papo Colo, Artist, New York City
Constance S. Congdon, Playwright; Playwright-in-Residence, Amherst College
Noble David Cook, Professor of History, Florida International University
Jonathan K. Crary, Associate Professor of Art History, Barnard College, Columbia University
Fred Curchack, Theatre Artist; Professor of Art and Performance, University of Texas at Dallas
Susan G. Davis, Associate Professor of Communication, University of California, San Diego
Pablo G. Debenedetti, Chair, Class of 1950 Professor of Chemical Engineering and Applied Science, Princeton University
Thomas J. Devlin, Professor of Physics, Rutgers University
Avinash Kamalakar Dixit, John J. F. Sherrerd '52 University Professor of Economics, Princeton University
Richard Mansfield Dudley, Professor of Mathematics, Massachusetts Institute of Technology
Dale F. Eickelman, Ralph and Richard Kleeman Lazarus Professor of Anthropology and Human Relations, Dartmouth College
Jean Bethke Elshtain, Laura Spelman Rockefeller Professor of Social and Political Ethics
Thomas M. Engelhardt, Writer, New York City
Bjorn Erik Engquist, Professor of Mathematics, University of California, Los Angeles
Robert P. Epstein, Film Maker, San Francisco, California
Anne Flournoy, Film Maker, New York City
Helene P. Foley, Olin Professor of Classics, Barnard College, Columbia University
Regenia A. Gagnier, Associate Professor of English, Stanford University
Alice P. Gast, Professor of Chemical Engineering, Stanford University
Michael Ghil, Professor of Atmospheric Sciences and Geophysics & Director, Institute of Geophysics & Planetary Physics (IGPP), University of California, Los Angeles
Allan F. Gibbard, Richard B. Brandt Professor of Philosophy, University of Michigan
Faye D. Ginsburg, Professor of Anthropology and Director, Certificate Program in Culture and Media, New York University
Francine du Plessix Gray, Writer, Warren, Connecticut
Mark Irwin Greene, John Eckman Professor of Medical Sciences and Head, Immunology and Center for Receptor Biology and Cell Growth, University of Pennsylvania
Edward L. Greenstein, Professor of Biblical Studies, The Jewish Theological Seminary of America
Jonathan E. Grindlay, Professor of Astronomy, Harvard University
Kenneth Gross, Professor of English, University of Rochester
Philip Haas, Film Maker, New York City
Harmony Hammond, Artist, Galisteo, New Mexico; Professor of Art, University of Arizona
Craig S. Harris, Composer and Musician, New York City
N. Katherine Hayles, Professor of English, University of California, Los Angeles
Cheryl Temple Herr, Associate Professor of English, University of Iowa
Haruzo Hida, Professor of Mathematics, University of California, Los Angeles
Dan Hofstadter, Writer, Philadelphia; Staff Writer, The New Yorker
Linda K. Hogan, Writer; Associate Professor of English, University of Colorado at Boulder
Michael A. Holly, Head of Research, Clark Institute of Art, Williamstown, MA
Keith J. Holyoak, Professor of Psychology, University of California, Los Angeles
Eric Holzman, Artist, New York City
David E. Irwin, Associate Professor of Psychology, University of Illinois at Urbana-Champaign
John T. Irwin, The Decker Professor in the Humanities; Professor of English, Johns Hopkins University
Rachel Jacoff, Marion Butler MacLean Professor of the History of Ideas and Professor of Italian, Wellesley College
Mark F. Jarman, Poet; Professor of English, Vanderbilt University
Brandt Junceau, Artist, Brooklyn, New York
Robert A. Kaster, Kennedy Foundation Professor of Latin Language and Literature and Professor of Classics, Princeton University
Stanley Kelley, Jr., Emeritus Professor of Politics, Princeton University
Richard Kieckhefer, Professor of the History and Literature of Religions, Northwestern University
James T. Kloppenberg, Professor of History, Harvard University
Win Knowlton, Artist, New York City
Nancy Harrison Kolodny, Nellie Z. Cohen and Anne Cohen Heller Professor of Chemistry, Wellesley College
Lucy Komisar, Journalist and Author, New York City
Dexter C. Kozen, Joseph Newton Pew, Jr. Professor in Engineering, Cornell University
Steve Krieckhaus, Choreographer, Glenmoore, Pennsylvania
Bruce K. Krueger, Professor of Physiology, University of Maryland at Baltimore
Anne LeBaron, Composer; Assistant Professor of Music, Pittsburgh, Pennsylvania
Herbert Leibowitz, Editor and Publisher, Parnassus: Poetry in Review, New York City; Professor Emeritus of English, Graduate Center and College of Staten Island, City University of New York
Richard E. Lenski, Professor of Microbial Ecology, Michigan State University
Douglas N. C. Lin, Professor of Astronomy and Astrophysics, University of California, Santa Cruz
Wendell M. Logan, Composer; Professor of African-American Music, Oberlin Conservatory of Music
Charles Beardsley Luce, Artist, Brooklyn, New York
Gail R. Martin, Professor of Biochemistry and Molecular Biology, University of California, Berkeley
G. Steven Martin, Professor of Molecular and Cell Biology, and Head, Division of Cell and Developmental Biology, University of California, Berkeley
Olga Matich, Professor of Slavic Languages and Literatures, University of California, Berkeley
Elaine Mayes, Photographer; Professor of Photography, Tisch School of the Arts, New York University
James H. Merrell, Professor of History on the Lucy Maynard Salmon Chair, Vassar College
Lorrie Moore, Writer; Professor of English, University of Wisconsin, Madison
David M. Moss, Composer, Performer, and Radio Artist, Marlboro, Vermont
Ian Mueller, Professor of Philosophy, University of Chicago
Matt Mullican, Artist, New York City
Susan Naquin, Professor of History, Princeton University
Vasudha Narayanan, Professor of Religion, University of Florida
Molly Nesbit, Professor of Art, Vassar College
Felicity A. Nussbaum, Professor of English, University of California, Los Angeles
Katharine F. Pantzer, Retired Research Bibliographer in the Houghton Library, Harvard College Library
Thomas G. Paterson, Retired Professor of History, University of Connecticut
Robert A. Pentelovitch, Artist, New York City
Philip Perkis, Photographer; Professor of Photography, Pratt Institute
Mary L. Poovey, Professor of English, New York University
Jeremy D. Popkin, Professor of History, University of Kentucky
Francine Prose, Writer, New York City
Venkatraman Ramakrishnan, MRC Laboratory of Molecular Biology, Cambridge, United Kingdom.
Matthew Ramsey, Associate Professor of History, Vanderbilt University
Velcheru Narayana Rao, Professor of South Asian Studies, University of Wisconsin–Madison
Thomas B. Rauchfuss, Director, School of Chemical Sciences, University of Illinois at Urbana-Champaign
Claude Rawson, Maynard Mack Professor of English, Yale University
Anne W. Robertson, Claire Dux Swift Professor of Music, University of Chicago
Martin Rocek, Professor of Physics, State University of New York at Stony Brook; Member, School of Natural Sciences, Institute for Advanced Study, Princeton, New Jersey
Susan Rose-Ackerman, Henry R. Luce Professor of Jurisprudence, Yale University
Barbara H. Rosenwein, Professor of History, Loyola University of Chicago
Edward Benjamin Rothstein, Music Critic, The New York Times; Fellow, New York Institute for the Humanities, New York University
Betye Irene Saar, Artist, Los Angeles
David William Sanford, Composer, Princeton, New Jersey
Londa L. Schiebinger, Professor of History and Women's Studies, Pennsylvania State University
Jeffrey T. Schnapp, Pierotti Chair in Italian Literature, Stanford University
Laurie Sheck, Poet, Princeton, New Jersey; Lecturer in English, Rutgers University
Jane Shore (poet), East Calais, Vermont; Associate Professor of English, George Washington University
Debora Shuger, Professor of English, University of California, Los Angeles
Neil Asher Silberman, Writer, Ohain, Belgium
Peter H. Solomon, Jr., Professor of Political Science, University of Toronto
Jana Sterbak, Artist, Montreal
Arthur L. Stinchcombe, Johns Evans Professor of Sociology and Professor of Political Science and Organization Behavior, Northwestern University
Edward H. Tenner, Writer, Plainsboro, New Jersey
John F. Torreano, Artist, New York City
Alan Trachtenberg, Neil Gray, Jr., Professor of English and American Studies, Yale University
Fred W. Turek, Professor of Neurobiology and Physiology, Northwestern University
Christopher Uhl, Associate Professor of Biology, Pennsylvania State University
Laurel Thatcher Ulrich, James Duncan Phillips Professor of Early American History and Professor of Women's Studies, Harvard University
Joseph J. Villafranca, Evan Pugh Professor of Chemistry, Pennsylvania State University: 1991
Joseph S. Viscomi, Lawrence Myer Slifkin Professor of Literature, University of North Carolina at Chapel Hill
Yoshimasa Wada, Artist, San Francisco
Calvert W. Watkins, Victor S. Thomas Professor of Linguistics and the Classics, Harvard University
Samuel Weber, Professor of English and Comparative Literature, University of California, Los Angeles
Liliane Weissberg, Joseph B. Glossberg Term Professor in the Humanities, University of Pennsylvania
Dara Wier, Poet; Professor of English, University of Massachusetts Amherst
Alan B. Williamson, Writer; Professor of English, University of California, Davis
Brenda Wineapple, Writer; Washington Irving Professor of Modern Literary and Historical Studies, Union College, Schenectady
Jeffrey A. Wolin, Photographer; Ruth N. Halls Professor of Photography, Indiana University Bloomington
Andrew Chi-Chih Yao, William and Edna Macaleer Professor of Engineering and Applied Science, Princeton University
David Da-Wei Yao, Thomas Alva Edison Professor of Industrial Engineering and Operations Research, Columbia University
Paul Zaloom, Theatre Artist, West Hollywood, California

Latin American and Caribbean Fellows
José M. Aguilera, Professor of Chemical Engineering and Associate Dean for Development, Catholic University of Chile, Santiago, Chile
Victor Hernández Cruz, Writer, Aguas Buenas, Puerto Rico
Carlos Augusto Di Prisco, Senior Researcher, Venezuelan Institute of Scientific Research, Caracas; Professor of Mathematics, Central University of Venezuela
José Miguel Franco Codinach, Professor of Fine Arts, Higher Institute of Art, Havana, Cuba
Alejandro Frank, Professor of Physics, Institute of Nuclear Sciences, National Autonomous University of Mexico, Mexico City
Luisa Futoransky, Writer, Paris, France
Norberto Gómez, Sculptor, Buenos Aires, Argentina
Efraín Gonzales de Olarte, Senior Economist, Institute of Peruvian Studies, Lima, Peru
Célia R. Gouvêa Vaneau, Choreographer, São Paulo, Brazil
Jorge Heine, Senior Fellow, Latin American Center for Economy and International Politics (CLEPI), Santiago, Chile
Jorge E. Illueca, Coordinator of Environmental Management and Chief, Terrestrial Ecosystems Branch of the United Nations Environment Program, Nairobi, Kenya
Alberto Kornblihtt, Career Scientist, Institute for Research in Genetic Engineering and Molecular Biology, National Research Council of Argentina; Professor of Molecular Biology, University of Buenos Aires
Alberto J. Laiseca, Writer, Buenos Aires, Argentina
Carlos Martínez Assad, Senior Researcher, Institute of Social Research, National Autonomous University of Mexico, Mexico City
Manuel R. Moreno Fraginals, Professor of the History of Culture, Higher Institute of Art, Havana, Cuba
Gustavo Moretto, Composer, New York City and Cliffside Park, New Jersey
José Nun, Senior Researcher, National Research Council of Argentina; Director, Latin American Center for the Analysis of Democracy (CLADE), Buenos Aires
Cecilia Portal, Photographer, Albuquerque, New Mexico
Adriana Puiggrós, Career Scientist, National Research Council of Argentina; Professor of the History of Argentine and Latin American Education, University of Buenos Aires
Alberto Guillermo Ranea, Career Scientist, National Research Council of Argentina; Professor of Philosophical Problems, Universidad Torcuato Di Tella, Buenos Aires
Ranulfo Romo, Professor of Neuroscience, Institute of Cellular Physiology, National Autonomous University of Mexico, Mexico City
Jerson L. Silva, Associate Professor of Biochemistry, Institute of Biomedical Sciences, Federal University of Rio de Janeiro, Brazil

External links
John Simon Guggenheim Memorial Foundation home page

1991
1991 awards